Eduard 'Edu' Albácar Gallego (born 16 November 1979) is a Spanish former professional footballer who played as a left-back.

Club career
Born in Tortosa, Tarragona, Catalonia, Albácar only played for Segunda División B and Tercera División teams until well into his 20s. In July 2006 he signed with Hércules CF in the Segunda División, and appeared in his first game as a professional on 27 August when he started in a 0–1 home loss against Málaga CF.

In June 2008, Albácar moved to Deportivo Alavés also in the second division. One year later, he signed with fellow second-tier club Rayo Vallecano.

On 22 July 2010, Albácar joined Elche CF. In his third year, he scored a career-best eight goals – mainly through free kicks and penalties– and also helped the Valencian side to return to La Liga after 24 years of absence.

On 24 August 2013, aged almost 34, Albácar made his debut in the top flight, starting in a 1–1 home draw against Real Sociedad. He scored his first goal in the competition six days later, in a 2–2 draw at UD Almería.

Albácar announced his retirement on 13 August 2015, being immediately included in Rubén Baraja's staff. Roughly a year later, he stepped down from retirement, returning to his last club Elche at the age of 36.

On 2 May 2018, Albácar announced that he would retire at the end of the season, which ended in promotion to the second division.

Honours
Elche
Segunda División: 2012–13

References

External links

1979 births
Living people
People from Tortosa
Sportspeople from the Province of Tarragona
Spanish footballers
Footballers from Catalonia
Association football defenders
La Liga players
Segunda División players
Segunda División B players
Tercera División players
RCD Espanyol B footballers
Novelda CF players
Alicante CF footballers
Hércules CF players
Deportivo Alavés players
Rayo Vallecano players
Elche CF players